Flora & Ulysses: The Illuminated Adventures is a children's novel by American author Kate DiCamillo and illustrated by K.G. Campbell, published in 2013 by Candlewick Press. It tells the story of Flora Belle Buckman and a squirrel named Ulysses.

The illustrations include full-page and small pencil drawings, together with comic-book panels describing the gang's adventures.

Plot
Set in the 21st century in a suburb of Vancouver, British Columbia, Canada, Flora Belle Buckman, a self-proclaimed cynic, spends her time reading comic books and struggling to understand her parents’ recent divorce. She is jolted into action when the neighbor runs over a squirrel with a vacuum cleaner. The vacuum cleaner is her neighbor's present for his wife. The squirrel's brush with death causes him to develop superpowers, allowing him to understand humans and become smarter. Flora then names the squirrel Ulysses after the vacuum cleaner accident.  Flora explains to Ulysses that he must use his newfound powers to right wrongs, fight injustice, "or something." Ulysses decides to write on Flora's mother's typewriter, revealing he can write poetry.

When Flora confronts her mother about her desire to kill Ulysses, a shouting match erupts in which Flora comes to believe her mother does not love her.  Flora, feeling hurt, declares that she will go home with her father. Ulysses writes a poem to explain Flora and her mother's real emotions, but Flora's mother kidnaps him before the poem can be read. Flora puts together a crack team to rescue Ulysses, who has already escaped, leaving Flora's mother to read his poem. The cast reunites in the father's apartment building where Flora's cynical exterior is cracked for good as she realizes her mother truly loves her.

Awards
Flora & Ulysses won the Newbery Medal for 2014.

Reception
The Horn Book review described the book as "heartwarming" with plenty of humor and a "quirky supporting cast", and notes that the illustrations "accentuate the mood".

Film adaptation

On May 31, 2018, it was announced that Disney was developing a film adaptation of the novel for their streaming service, Disney+, with Brad Copeland writing the script. Matilda Lawler stars as Flora, and her parents are played by Alyson Hannigan and Ben Schwartz. The film was released on February 20, 2021, streaming on Disney+.

References

2013 American novels
2013 children's books
American children's novels
Superhero novels
Newbery Medal–winning works
American novels adapted into films
Children's novels about animals
Fictional squirrels
Candlewick Press books